Thomas (Tom) William May is a mycologist at the National Herbarium of Victoria where he specialises in the taxonomy and ecology of Australian macrofungi. He is most notable for the comprehensive bibliographical lists of all Australian fungi published thus far; Volume 2A, published in 1997, and Volume 2B, published in 2003.  as well as the originator of Fungimap, an Australia-wide mapping fungal mapping scheme based on observations of 100 easily identified macrofungi. May was awarded the 2014 Australian Natural History Medallion.

See also 
 :Category:Taxa named by Tom May (mycologist)
 Fungi of Australia
 List of mycologists

References

External links 

 Bibliography at Google Scholar

Australian mycologists
Year of birth missing (living people)
Living people
Muelleria (journal) editors